The Petit train de banlieue (PTB) is a passenger train providing regular commuter rail service between the  and Thiès via Thiaroye and Rufisque.

History 
In December 1987, the service was started under the name "Petit train bleu" (Little Blue Train) by the Société nationale de chemins de fer du Sénégal (SNCS). The train ran 10 times per day (12 times according to the Senegalese Government) between Dakar and Thiaroye. This augmented to 22 runs per day in February 1988, 36 in December 1990, and 38 from 1992.

On June 2, 2003, the Petit Train de Banlieue was created as a société anonyme owned by the state. It is nowadays heavily used and served almost 5 million passengers in 2009.

In addition to the Dakar–Rufisque line, the PTB runs services between Dakar and Thiès.

2015 
In 2015, the Government announced plans to build a new parallel electrified standard gauge line called Train Express Regional as far as Diamniadio, 36 kilometres from Dakar.

This will be followed by a 19 km branch to the Blaise Diagne International Airport, near Ndiass.

Statistics

See also
 Railway stations in Senegal
 Dakar–Niger Railway

References

External links
 http://www.au-senegal.com/Le-chemin-de-fer.html (in French)
 Pictures of the train and timetables from 2005
 Mémento des transports terrestres 2007, chapitre 9 (in French)

Metre gauge railways in Senegal